The 1980 Idaho State Bengals football team represented the Idaho State University as a member of the Big Sky Conference during the 1980 NCAA Division I-AA football season. Led by first-year head coach Dave Kragthorpe, the Bengals compiled an overall record of 6–5 and a mark of 4–4 in conference play, placing fourth in their Big Sky. Before their first win, the Bengals had the longest losing streak in Division I-AA.

Schedule

Roster

References

Idaho State
Idaho State Bengals football seasons
Idaho State Bengals football